Mok-dong Baseball Stadium is a stadium located in Seoul, South Korea. The stadium was the home of the Nexen Heroes of the Korea Baseball Organization between 2008 and 2015. The stadium is part of the Mokdong Sports Complex.

See also 

 Mokdong Stadium
 Dongdaemun Baseball Stadium
 Jamsil Baseball Stadium
 Gocheok Sky Dome

External links
 Seoul Sports Facilities Management Center 
 Mokdong Baseball Stadium at worldstadiums.com

Baseball venues in South Korea
Sports venues completed in 1989
Kiwoom Heroes
Yangcheon District
Sports venues in Seoul
American football venues in Asia
1989 establishments in South Korea
20th-century architecture in South Korea